Filipa Gabrovska (born 26 March 1982) is a former professional tennis player from Bulgaria.

Born in Varna, Gabrovska played in six Fed Cup ties for Bulgaria between 1998 and 2002.

Gabrovska is now based in the Austrian capital Vienna, where she coaches tennis.

ITF Circuit finals

Doubles: 4 (2 titles, 2 runner–ups)

References

External links
 
 
 

1982 births
Living people
Bulgarian female tennis players
Sportspeople from Varna, Bulgaria
Bulgarian expatriates in Austria